Paul Elvinger (14 October 1907 – 1 December 1982) was a Luxembourgian lawyer and politician. He was a member of the Luxembourgian Democratic Party.

References

1907 births
1982 deaths
20th-century Luxembourgian lawyers
Luxembourgian politicians
People from Luxembourg City
Grand Crosses with Star and Sash of the Order of Merit of the Federal Republic of Germany